In mathematics, Fatou components are components of the Fatou set.  They were named after Pierre Fatou.

Rational case
If f is a rational function

defined in the extended complex plane, and if it is a nonlinear function (degree > 1)

 

then for a periodic component  of the Fatou set, exactly one of the following holds:

  contains an attracting periodic point
  is parabolic
  is a Siegel disc:  a simply connected Fatou component on which f(z) is analytically conjugate to a Euclidean rotation of the unit disc onto itself by an irrational rotation angle.
  is a Herman ring: a double connected Fatou component (an annulus) on which f(z) is analytically conjugate to a Euclidean rotation of a round annulus, again by an irrational rotation angle.

Attracting periodic point
This is because the map is the one to use for finding solutions to the equation  by Newton–Raphson formula. The solutions must naturally be attracting fixed points.

Herman ring
The map

and t = 0.6151732... will produce a Herman ring. It is shown by Shishikura that the degree of such map must be at least 3, as in this example.

More than one type of component
If degree d is greater than 2 then there is more than one critical point and then can be more than one type of component

Transcendental case

Baker domain
In case of transcendental functions there is another type of periodic Fatou components, called Baker domain: these are "domains on which the iterates tend to an essential singularity (not possible for polynomials and rational functions)" one example of such a function is:

Wandering domain
Transcendental maps may have wandering domains: these are Fatou components that are not eventually periodic.

See also
 No-wandering-domain theorem
 Montel's theorem
 John Domains
 Basins of attraction

References
 Lennart Carleson and Theodore W. Gamelin, Complex Dynamics, Springer 1993.
 Alan F. Beardon Iteration of Rational Functions, Springer 1991.

Fractals
Limit sets
Theorems in complex analysis
Complex dynamics
Theorems in dynamical systems
Mathematical classification systems